Tennis events were contested at the 1965 Summer Universiade in Budapest, Hungary.

Medal summary

Medal table

See also
 Tennis at the Summer Universiade

External links
World University Games Tennis on HickokSports.com

1965
Universiade
1965 Summer Universiade